The First Council of Lyon (Lyon I) was the thirteenth ecumenical council, as numbered by the Catholic Church, taking place in 1245.

The First General Council of Lyon was presided over by Pope Innocent IV. Innocent IV, threatened by Holy Roman Emperor Frederick II, arrived at Lyon on 2 December 1244, and early the following year he summoned the Church's bishops to the council later that same year. Some two hundred and fifty prelates responded including the Latin Patriarchs of Constantinople, Antioch, and Aquileia (Venice) and 140 bishops. The Latin emperor Baldwin II of Constantinople, Raymond VII, Count of Toulouse, and Raymond Bérenger IV, Count of Provence were among those who participated. With Rome under siege by Emperor Frederick II, the pope used the council to excommunicate and depose the emperor with Ad Apostolicae Dignitatis Apicem, as well as the Portuguese King Sancho II. The council also directed a new crusade (the Seventh Crusade), under the command of Louis IX of France, to reconquer the Holy Land.

At the opening, on 28 June, after the singing of the Veni Creator, Spiritu, Innocent IV preached on the subject of the five wounds of the Church and compared them to his own five sorrows: (1) the poor behaviour of both clergy and laity; (2) the insolence of the Saracens who occupied the Holy Land; (3) the Great East-West Schism; (4) the cruelties of the Tatars in Hungary; and (5) the persecution of the Church by the Emperor Frederick.

The council of Lyon was rather poorly attended. Since the great majority of those bishops and archbishops present came from France, Italy and Spain, while the Byzantine Greeks and the other countries, especially Germany, were but weakly represented, the ambassador of Frederick, Thaddaeus of Suessa, contested its ecumenicity in the assembly itself. In a letter, Innocent IV had urged Kaliman I of Bulgaria to send representatives. In the bull Cum simus super (25 March 1245), he also urged the Vlachs, Serbs, Alans, Georgians, Nubians, the Church of the East and all the other Eastern Christians not in union with Rome to send representatives. In the end, the only known non-Latin cleric present was Peter, the bishop of Belgorod and vicar of the metropolitanate of Kiev, who provided Innocent with intelligence on the Mongols prior to the council. His information, in the form of the Tractatus de ortu Tartarorum, circulated among attendees.

The condemnation of the emperor was a foregone conclusion. The objections of the ambassador, that the accused had not been regularly cited, that the pope was plaintiff and judge in one, and that therefore the whole process was anomalous, achieved as little success as his appeal to the future pontiff and to a truly ecumenical council.

At the second session on 5 July, the bishop of Calvi and a Spanish archbishop attacked the emperor's behaviour, and in a subsequent session on 17 July, Innocent pronounced the deposition of Frederick. The deposition was signed by one hundred and fifty bishops and the Dominicans and Franciscans were given the responsibility for its publication. However, Innocent IV did not possess the material means to enforce the decree.

The Council of Lyon promulgated several other purely disciplinary measures:

 It obliged the Cistercians to pay tithes
 It approved the Rule of the Grandmontines
 It decided the institution of the Octave of the Nativity of the Blessed Virgin
 It prescribed that cardinals were to wear a red hat
 It prepared thirty-eight constitutions which were later inserted by Boniface VIII in his Decretals, the most important of which decreed a levy of a twentieth on every benefice for three years for the relief of the Holy Land.

Among those attending was Thomas Cantilupe who was made a papal chaplain and given a dispensation to hold his benefices in plurality.

References

Sources

External links
First Council of Lyon

1245 in Europe
1240s in France
Lyon 1
Lyon 1
Medieval Lyon
Lyon 1
Pope Innocent IV
Frederick II, Holy Roman Emperor